Sundacarpus is a monotypic genus of conifers containing a single species Sundacarpus amarus, belonging to the family Podocarpaceae. Sundacarpus was designated a genus by C.N.Page in 1989; formerly it had been classified variously as a species of Podocarpus or of Prumnopitys.

Sundacarpus amarus is native to parts of Australia and Malesia. In Australia, the genus is found only in Queensland, primarily on the Atherton Tableland and adjacent parts of northeastern coastal Queensland. It is quite common in New Guinea, New Britain, and New Ireland, where they are often found in montane forests together with southern beech (Nothofagus). Sundacarpus amarus is also found on the Indonesian islands of Buru, Halmahera, Morotai, Sulawesi, Lombok, Flores, Timor, Sumbawa, Java, Sumatra, in Sabah province on the island of Borneo and on Mindanao and Luzon in the Philippines.

References

de Laubenfels, D. J. (1988). Coniferales. pp. 337–453 in Flora Malesiana, Series I, Vol. 10. Dordrecht: Kluwer Academic. 
Page, C. N. (1989). New and maintained genera in the conifer families Podocarpaceae and Pinaceae. Notes of the Royal Botanical Garden Edinburgh 45 (2): 377–395.

External links
Sundacarpus amarus at the Gymnosperm Database

Podocarpaceae
Flora of Queensland
Trees of Malesia
Trees of New Guinea
Pinales of Australia
Least concern flora of Australia
Least concern biota of Queensland
Podocarpaceae genera
Monotypic conifer genera
Flora of the Borneo montane rain forests